R.I.P.R.O. is a series of mixtapes by French rapper Lacrim. R.I.P.R.O. designates Rusé, Insoumis, Professionel, Respectable, Omerta (Crafty, Unruly, Professional, Respectable, Omerta).

Volume 1

R.I.P.R.O. Volume I was released on June 1, 2015 by Ripro Music and Def Jam France. The album was co-produced by DJ Bellek and Kore with one additional track produced by The MeKanics & Spiff and one additional track co-produced by Beatzeps.

Track listing
"Sale époque Part.2" (4:19)
"Corleone Remix" (feat. Young Breed, Billy Blue, YT Triz & Rimkus) (6:20)
"Carte de la vieillesse" (5:08)
"Money" (feat. Migos) (3:30)
"Sablier" (3:49)
"Mon fils" (4:39)
"Voyous" (feat. Gradur) (3:43)
"Red Zone" (feat. Nessbeal & Rimkus) (4:07)
"Ça débite" (3:14)
"Y.a.R" (3:42)
"A.W.A. 2" (3:55)
"6.35" (feat. SCH & Sadek) (4:02)
"Billets en l'air" (3:12)
"Millions" (SCH) (3:14)

Charts and certifications

Volume 2

R.I.P.R.O. Volume 2 (full name Kore & Lacrim présentent R.I.P.R.O. 2) was released on December 11, 2015 by Ripro Music and Def Jam France. It was fully produced by Kore.

Track listing
"Poutine" (3:07)
"Gustavo Gaviria" (3:06)
"J'ai mal" (3:49)
"Brasse au max" (3:13)
"Petit jaloux" (featuring Maître Gims) (3:23)
"Marabout" (3:47)
"C'est ma vie" (3:03)
"Casa" (3:45)
"Adieu" (4:11)
"Sur ma mère" (4:19)
"En la calle" (featuring Yandel) (3:32)
"On y est" (featuring SCH, Rimkus & Walid) (4:14)
"On se reverra" (3:29)
"Du papier" (Rimkus)

Charts and certifications

Volume 3

R.I.P.R.O. Volume 3 was released on November 17, 2017 by Ripro Music and Def Jam France. 

Track listing
"Partis de rien" (4:04)	
"Ce soir ne sors pas" (feat. Maître Gims) (3:53)	
"La valise" (3:27)	
"Vory v zakone" (3:31)	
"Intocable" (feat. Mister You) (3:44)	
"J'essaie" (2:37)	
"Rio" (3:29)	
"ALP - Pause" (3:17)	
"Noche" (feat. Damso) (3:38)	
"Tous les mêmes" (3:12)	
"Mode S" (3:00)	
"Veux-tu?" (feat. Ninho) (3:21)	
"Audemars Piguet" (3:45)	
"Judy Moncada" (3:14)	
"London Blues" (feat. Paigey Cakey) (3:19)	
"Guy 2 Bezbar - Strike" (3:40)	
"3dabi" (feat. Shayfeen & Madd) (4:18)	
"Gericault" (3:19)

Charts and certifications

Volume 4

R.I.P.R.O. Volume 4 was released on October 16, 2020 by Ripro Music and Def Jam France. 

Track listing
"El Professor" (2:23)
"Jacques Chirac" (2:56)
"Nipsey Hussle" (feat. Niska) (2:55)
"Végéta" (3:15)
"Dadinho" (feat. Ninho) (3:28)
"Rafa & Carlos" (3:11)
"Boston George" (feat. Maes) (3:22)
"Picasso" (3:13)
"Big Meech" (feat. Leto) (3:13)
"Penelope Cruz" (3:07)
"Eric Cantona" (feat. Jul) (2:58)
"Allez nique ta mère" (feat. Soso Maness) (2:43)
"Dracula" (feat. Vladimir Cauchemar & Sfera Ebbasta) (2:32)
"Sam & Driss" (3:33)
"Zizou" (3:10)
"Kadryrov" (feat. Goulag) (3:24)
"Le Petit Nicolas" (3:27)

Charts and certifications

References

French-language albums
2015 mixtape albums
2017 mixtape albums
Lacrim albums